Pilar Molina Llorente (born 11 December 1943) is a Spanish children's literature writer.

She holds a licentiate in Fine Arts, with studies in music, philology, and psychology. She has translated several children's and young adult works from Italian and English into Spanish.

Awards
 1964: Doncel Novel Award for Ut y las estrellas
 1972: Doncel Biography Award for El terrible florentino
 1973: Comisión Católica Española de la Infancia (CCEI) Award for El terrible florentino
 1984: Honorable mention for the CCEI for Patatita
 1994: Honorable mention for the CCEI for La sombra de la daga
 1994: Mildred L. Batchelder Award for El Aprendiz
 2013:  for Tesa

Works
 Ut y las estrellas (1964)
 El terrible florentino (1973)
 Romualdo el grillo (1974)
 Carrousel 5 (1976)
 El mensaje de Maese Zamaor (1981)
 Patatita (1983)
 El parque de papel: poemas (1984)
 La visita de la Condesa (1987)
 El largo verano de Eugenia Mestre (1987)
 Aura gris (1988)
 El aprendiz (1989)
 Piñata: Libro del profesor (1990)
 La sombra de la daga (1993)
 Navidad, el regreso de Eugenia Mestre (1994)
 ¿Quién pasa primero? (1997)
 Pálpito de Sol (2001)
 Hora de Siesta (2006)
 A de alas, a de abuela (2012)
 Tesa. El despacho de don Baltasar de Garciherreros (2013)

References

1943 births
20th-century Spanish women writers
21st-century Spanish women writers
Spanish translators
English–Spanish translators
Italian–Spanish translators
Living people
Spanish children's writers
Writers from Madrid